Pan Am Equities is a real estate company owned by the Manocherian family that develops and operates real estate properties, along with its sister company Manocherian Brothers

The company focuses on the redevelopment of Upper East Side tenement blocks.

Buildings owned by the company include New York Tower at East 39th Street and the Caroline at 60 West 23rd Street. The owners of the company also own the New York Health & Racquet Club.

History
In 2014, the company bought two commercial condominiums in the Upper East Side, covering a total of 45,000 square feet. The seller was Philadelphia-based real estate investment fund manager Equus Capital Partners.

In April 2016, Pan Am Equities sold 6 multifamily rental buildings in the East Village to The Lightstone Group for $127 million.

In 2019 the firm announced the Glassell Park project, a 419-unit apartment complex located at the entrance of the new Bowtie State Park along the Los Angeles River. The project received harsh criticism from river activists.

References 

Real estate companies of the United States
Privately held companies of the United States
Manocherian family